Highway 55 is a paved, undivided provincial highway in the Canadian province of Saskatchewan. It runs from the Alberta border west of Pierceland (where it continues as Alberta Highway 55) to Highway 9 near Mountain Cabin. Highway 55 is 652 km long. It forms part of the interprovincial Northern Woods and Water Route.

Attractions
On the west portion of Highway 55 from the Alberta border, the village of Pierceland is located at Highway 21. To the north of Pierceland is Meadow Lake Provincial Park. This provincial park stretches about 115 kilometres from the Alberta border at Cold Lake to just north of the city of Meadow Lake, Saskatchewan at Waterhen Lake.

The regional park of Morin Lake is 15 km south of the highway near Debden, Saskatchewan, and Victoire, Saskatchewan.  Nipawin Bridge located on Highway 55 is Saskatchewan's longest bridge.

Wildcat Hill Provincial Park is located just south of the eastern end of the highway; however, the park itself is only accessible by ATV or snowmobile.

Major intersections
From west to east:

See also 
Roads in Saskatchewan
Transportation in Saskatchewan

References 

055
Northern Woods and Water Route
Transport in Prince Albert, Saskatchewan